Silvia Ziche (born 5 July 1967) is an Italian comic book artist and writer, known for her work in Disney comics for the Italian comic digest Topolino.

Biography
Ziche was born in Thiene. Ziche has also worked on the magazines Linus, Comix and Cuore.

She is known for her long story arcs published during successive issues of Topolino, such as "Paperina di Rivondosa", "Topokolossal", "Il papero del mistero", "Il Grande Splash" and "Papere alla deriva".

Awards and honours
Ziche won the 1997 Lucca Comics' Panther Award for Best Emerging Author and the 1999 Lucca Comics' Panther Award for Best Designer of Humorous Comics.

References

External links
  
 
 Silvia Ziche at the Lambiek Comiclopedia

1967 births
Living people
20th-century Italian women artists
21st-century Italian women artists
People from Thiene
Italian comics artists
Italian comics writers
Italian female comics artists
Female comics writers
Disney comics artists